Lillian Goodwin was an American businesswoman who co-founded GEICO with her husband Leo Goodwin, Sr. in 1936.

Background and Family
She was married to Leo Goodwin, Sr. and mother to Leo Goodwin, Jr. She moved to Fort Lauderdale, Florida in the 1960s. She died in 1970.

Professional career
Lillian Goodwin worked alongside her husband to launch GEICO and took an active role in virtually all aspects of the early operation. Lillian, a bookkeeper by profession, took on the accounting tasks but also worked to underwrite policies, set rates, issue policies and market auto insurance to GEICO’s target customers, federal employees and the top three grades of noncommissioned military officers.
She worked up to 12 hours a day at the inception of GEICO.

References

American women in business
1970 deaths
Year of birth missing
GEICO